Deutschland was the lead ship of her class of heavy cruisers (often termed pocket battleships) which served with the Kriegsmarine of Nazi Germany during World War II. Ordered by the Weimar government for the Reichsmarine, she was laid down at the Deutsche Werke shipyard in Kiel in February 1929 and completed by April 1933. Originally classified as an armored ship (Panzerschiff) by the Reichsmarine, in February 1940 the Germans reclassified the remaining two ships of this class as heavy cruisers. In 1940, she was renamed Lützow, after the unfinished  heavy cruiser  was sold to the Soviet Union the previous year.

The ship saw significant action with the Kriegsmarine, including several non-intervention patrols in the Spanish Civil War, during which she was attacked by Republican bombers. At the outbreak of World War II, she was cruising the North Atlantic, prepared to attack Allied merchant traffic. Bad weather hampered her efforts, and she sank or captured only a handful of vessels before returning to Germany. She then participated in Operation Weserübung, the invasion of Norway. Damaged at the Battle of Drøbak Sound, she was recalled to Germany for repairs. While en route, she was torpedoed and seriously damaged by a British submarine.

Repairs were completed by March 1941, and Lützow returned to Norway to join the forces arrayed against Allied shipping to the Soviet Union. She ran aground during a planned attack on convoy PQ 17, which necessitated another return to Germany for repairs. She next saw action at the Battle of the Barents Sea with the heavy cruiser , which ended with a failure to destroy the convoy JW 51B. Engine problems forced a series of repairs culminating in a complete overhaul at the end of 1943, after which the ship remained in the Baltic. Sunk in shallow waters in the Kaiserfahrt in April 1945 by Royal Air Force (RAF) bombers, Lützow was used as a gun battery to support German troops fighting the Soviet Army until 4 May 1945, when she was disabled by her crew. Raised by the Soviet Navy in 1947, she was subsequently sunk as a target in the Baltic.

Design 

Deutschland was powered by four sets of MAN 9-cylinder double-acting two-stroke diesel engines. As designed, her standard complement consisted of 33 officers and 586 enlisted men, though after 1935 this was significantly increased to 30 officers and 921–1,040 sailors.

Deutschlands primary armament was six  SK C/28 guns mounted in two triple gun turrets, one forward and one aft of the superstructure. The ship carried a secondary battery of eight  SK C/28 guns in single turrets grouped amidships. Her anti-aircraft battery originally consisted of three  L/45 guns, though in 1935 these were replaced with six 8.8 cm L/78 guns. In 1940, the 8.8 cm guns were removed, and six  L/65 guns, four  guns, and ten  guns were installed in their place. By the end of the war, her anti-aircraft battery had again been reorganized, consisting of six  guns, ten 3.7 cm guns, and twenty-eight 2 cm guns.

The ship also carried a pair of quadruple  deck-mounted torpedo tubes placed on her stern. The ship was equipped with two Arado Ar 196 seaplanes and one catapult. Radar initially consisted of a FMG G(gO) "Seetakt" set; in 1942, a FuMO 26 set was also installed.

History 

Deutschland was ordered by the Reichsmarine from the Deutsche Werke shipyard in Kiel as Ersatz Preussen, a replacement for the old pre-dreadnought battleship . Her keel was laid on 5 February 1929, under construction number 219. The ship was launched on 19 May 1931; at her launching, she was christened by German Chancellor Heinrich Brüning. The ship accidentally started sliding down the slipway while Brüning was giving his christening speech. After the completion of fitting out work, initial sea trials began in November 1932. The ship was commissioned into the Reichsmarine on 1 April 1933.

Trials were completed by December 1933, and the ship was ready for active service with the fleet. The ship also made a series of goodwill visits to foreign ports, including visits to Gothenburg, Sweden, and in October 1934, a formal state visit to Edinburgh, Scotland. In April 1934, Adolf Hitler visited the ship; he reportedly toured the ship alone, speaking informally with crewmen.

The ship conducted a series of long-distance training voyages into the Atlantic in 1935. In March 1935, she sailed as far as the Caribbean and South American waters. After returning to Germany, she went into dock for routine maintenance work, as well as installation of additional equipment. She had her aircraft catapult installed in this period, and was provided with two Heinkel He 60 floatplanes. Deutschland participated in fleet maneuvers in German waters in early 1936. She was joined by her newly commissioned sister ship  for a cruise into the mid-Atlantic, which included a stop in Madeira.

Spanish Civil War 
Following the outbreak of the Spanish Civil War in 1936, Deutschland and Admiral Scheer were deployed to the Spanish coast on 23 July 1936 to conduct non-intervention patrols off the Republican-held coast of Spain. During the deployment, her gun turrets were painted with large black, white, and red bands to aid in identification from the air and indicate her neutral status. Her duties during the deployment included evacuating refugees fleeing from the fighting, protecting German ships carrying supplies for Francisco Franco's Nationalists, and gathering intelligence for the Nationalists.

In May 1937, the ship was docked in the port of Palma on the island of Majorca, along with several other neutral warships, including vessels from the British and Italian navies. The port was attacked by Republican aircraft, though anti-aircraft fire from the warships drove them off. The torpedo boats  and  escorted Deutschland to the island of Ibiza on 24 May. While moored in port there, she was again attacked by Republican bombers; a pair of Soviet-built SB-2 bombers, secretly flown by Soviet Air Force pilots, bombed the ship. Two bombs struck the ship; the first penetrated the upper deck near the bridge and exploded above the main armored deck while the second hit near the third starboard 15 cm gun, causing serious fires below decks. The attack killed 31 German sailors and wounded 74.

Deutschland quickly weighed anchor and left port. She rendezvoused with Admiral Scheer to take on additional doctors before proceeding to Gibraltar where the dead were buried with full military honors. Ten days later, however, Hitler ordered the men be exhumed and returned for burial in Germany. The ship's wounded men were also evacuated in Gibraltar for treatment. Hitler, furious over the attack, ordered Admiral Scheer to bombard the port of Almería in retaliation for the so-called "Deutschland incident". Stalin subsequently issued orders that further attacks on German and Italian warships were strictly prohibited.

Deutschland spent the majority of 1938 and 1939 conducting training maneuvers with the rest of the fleet and making goodwill visits to various foreign ports. She made an official visit to Spain following the Nationalist victory in the Spanish Civil War 1939.

World War II 

On 24 August 1939, a week before the German invasion of Poland, Deutschland set sail from Wilhelmshaven, bound for a position south of Greenland. Here, she would be ready to attack Allied merchant traffic in the event of a general war following the attack on Poland. The supply ship  was assigned to support Deutschland during the operation. Deutschland was ordered to strictly observe prize rules, which required raiders to stop and search ships for contraband before sinking them, and to ensure that their crews are safely evacuated. The ship was also ordered to avoid combat with even inferior naval forces, as commerce disruption was the primary objective. Hitler hoped to secure a negotiated peace with Britain and France after he overran Poland, and he therefore did not authorize Deutschland to begin her raiding mission against British and French shipping until 26 September. By this time, Deutschland had moved south to hunt in the Bermuda-Azores sea lane.

On 5 October, she found and sank the British transport ship Stonegate, though not before the freighter was able to send a distress signal informing vessels in the area of Deutschlands presence. She then turned north to the Halifax route, where on 9 October, she encountered the American ship . The  freighter was found to be carrying contraband, and so was seized. A prize crew was dispatched to the ship; they took the ship with the original crew held prisoner to Germany via Murmansk. The ship was seized by Norway when she anchored in Haugesund, however, and control of the ship was returned to the original crew. The same day, she stopped the neutral Danish steamer Kongsdal, though when it became apparent that she was headed for a neutral port, the prisoners from Lorentz W Hansen were placed aboard her and she was allowed to proceed. Kongsdal later reported the encounter to the British Royal Navy and confirmed Deutschland as the raider operating in the North Atlantic.

Severe weather in the North Atlantic hampered Deutschlands raiding mission, though she did tie down several British warships assigned to track her down. The French Force de Raid, centered on the battleship , was occupied with protecting convoys around Britain to prevent them from being attacked by Deutschland. In early November, the Naval High Command recalled Deutschland; she passed through the Denmark Strait on 15 November and anchored in Gotenhafen on the 17th. In the course of her raiding mission, she sank only two vessels and captured a third. In 1940, the ship underwent a major overhaul, during which a raked clipper bow was installed to improve the sea-keeping qualities of the ship. At this time, she was re-rated as a heavy cruiser and renamed Lützow. Hitler himself made the decision to rename the ship, recognizing that the sinking of a warship, always possible, was a propaganda disaster if it bore the name of its country. The refit took until March 1940, after which it was intended to send the ship on another commerce-raiding operation into the South Atlantic. In April, however, she was assigned to forces participating in the invasion of Norway.

Operation Weserübung 

Lützow was assigned to Group 5, alongside the new heavy cruiser  and the light cruiser  under the command of Konteradmiral Oskar Kummetz. Kummetz flew his flag in Blücher. Group 5 was tasked with capturing Oslo, the capital of Norway, and transported a force of 2,000 mountain troops from the Wehrmacht. Lützow embarked over 400 of the soldiers for the voyage to Norway. The force left Germany on 8 April and passed through the Kattegat. While en route, the British submarine  attacked the flotilla; her torpedoes missed, and German torpedo boats  drove the submarine off.

Shortly before midnight on the night of 8 April, Group 5, with Blücher in the lead, passed the outer ring of Norwegian coastal batteries. Lützow followed directly behind the flagship, with Emden astern. Heavy fog and neutrality requirements, which required the Norwegians to fire warning shots, permitted the Germans to avoid damage. The Norwegians, including those manning the guns at the Oscarsborg Fortress were on alert, however. During the ensuing Battle of Drøbak Sound, Blücher was hit by many shells and two torpedoes. She quickly capsized and sank with the loss of approximately 1,000 sailors and soldiers. Lützow was hit three times by 15 cm shells from Oscarsborg's Kopås battery, causing significant damage.

Lützows forward gun turret was hit by one of the 15 cm rounds, which disabled the center gun and damaged the right barrel. Four men were wounded. A second shell struck the ship's deck and penetrated the upper and main armored decks; starting a fire in the cruiser's hospital and operating theater, killing two soldiers and severely wounding six others. A third struck her superstructure behind the port-side aircraft crane. One of the aircraft on board was damaged, and four gunners were killed by the third shell. The ship was only able to fire her secondary battery in return. The heavy damage forced Lützow and the rest of the squadron to reverse course and exit the fjord. She eventually landed her troop complement in Verle Bay, after which she used her operational 28 cm guns to provide fire support. By the afternoon of 9 April, most of the Norwegian fortresses had been captured and the commander of the remaining Norwegian forces opened negotiations for surrender. The delay had, however, allowed enough time for the Norwegian government and royal family to flee Oslo.

The damage Lützow sustained prompted the Kriegsmarine to order her to return to Germany for repairs. The rest of Group 5 remained in Norway, so Lützow cruised at top speed to avoid submarines. Nevertheless, the British submarine  attacked the ship on 11 April and scored a serious hit. The torpedo destroyed Lützows stern, causing it to collapse and nearly fall off, and blew off her steering gear. Unable to steer, she was towed back to port and decommissioned for repairs, which lasted for nearly a year. During the attack on Norway, the ship suffered nineteen dead, and another fifteen were killed by the torpedo strike. Despite the setback, KzS August Thiele, Lützows commander, was awarded the Knight's Cross of the Iron Cross for his actions during the Battle of Drøbak Sound, during which he took command of the task force after the loss of Blücher.

Lützow was recommissioned for service on 31 March 1941, after which the Kriegsmarine initially planned to send the ship on the commerce raiding operation planned the previous year. Her sister Admiral Scheer was to join Lützow for the operation, and on 12 June she departed for Norway with an escort of destroyers. British torpedo bombers attacked the ship off Egersund and scored a single hit that disabled her electrical system and rendered the ship motionless. She took on a severe list to port and the port shaft was damaged. The crew effected emergency repairs that allowed her to return to Germany; repair work in Kiel took six months. By 10 May 1942, the ship was finally pronounced ready for action.

Deployment to Norway 
Lützow left Germany on 15 May 1942 for Norway to join forces intended to disrupt Allied shipping to the Soviet Union; by 25 May she had joined Admiral Scheer in Bogen Bay. She was made the flagship of the now Vizeadmiral Kummetz, the commander of Kampfgruppe 2. Fuel shortages restricted operations, although Lützow and Admiral Scheer were able to conduct limited battle training exercises. Kampfgruppe 2 was assigned to Operation Rösselsprung, a planned attack on the Allied convoy PQ 17, which was headed to the Soviet Union. On 3 July, the force left their anchorages, and in heavy fog Lützow and three destroyers ran aground and suffered significant damage. The British detected the German departure and ordered the convoy to scatter. Aware that surprise had been lost, the Germans broke off the surface attack and turned the destruction of PQ 17 over to the U-boats and Luftwaffe. Twenty-four of the convoy's thirty-five transports were sunk. Lützow returned to Germany for repairs, which took until the end of October. She began a brief set of trials starting on 30 October. She returned to Norway in early November with a destroyer escort, arriving in Narvik on the 12th.

On 30 December, Lützow, the heavy cruiser , and six destroyers left Narvik for Operation Regenbogen, an attack on convoy JW 51B, which was reported by German intelligence to be lightly escorted. Kummetz's plan was to divide his force in half; he would take Admiral Hipper and three destroyers north of the convoy to attack it and draw away the escorts. Lützow and the remaining three destroyers would then attack the undefended convoy from the south. At 09:15 on the 31st, the British destroyer  spotted the three destroyers screening for Admiral Hipper; the Germans opened fire first. Four of the other five destroyers escorting the convoy rushed to join the fight, while  laid a smoke screen to cover the convoy. Kummetz then turned back north to draw the destroyers away. Captain Robert Sherbrooke, the British escort commander, left two destroyers to cover the convoy while he took the remaining four to pursue Admiral Hipper.

Lützow meanwhile steamed toward the convoy from the south, and at 11:42 she opened fire. The harsh conditions made accurate fire difficult; she ceased shooting by 12:03 without any hits. The cruisers engaged Admiral Hipper, which had been firing to port at the destroyer . Burnett's ships approached from Admiral Hippers starboard side and achieved complete surprise. Lützow was then ordered to break off the attack on the convoy and reinforce Admiral Hipper. Lützow inadvertently came alongside Sheffield and Jamaica, and after identifying them as hostile, engaged them, though her fire remained inaccurate. The British cruisers turned toward Lützow and came under fire from both German cruisers. Burnett quickly decided to withdraw in the face of superior German firepower; his ships were armed with  guns, while Admiral Hipper carried  guns, and Lützow had 28 cm guns.

Operations in the Baltic 

Hitler was furious over the failure to destroy the convoy, and ordered that all remaining German major warships be broken up for scrap. In protest, Raeder resigned; Hitler replaced him with Admiral Karl Dönitz, who persuaded Hitler to rescind the order to dismantle the surface ships of the Kriegsmarine. In March, Lützow moved to Altafjord, where she experienced problems with her diesel engines. The propulsion system proved to be so unreliable that repairs in Germany were necessary. She briefly returned to Norway but by the end of September 1943, a thorough overhaul was required. The work was completed in Kiel by January 1944, after which she remained in the Baltic Sea to conduct training cruises for new naval personnel.

The RAF failed again two days later, but on 16 April eighteen Lancasters from 617 ("Dambusters") squadron scored a hit and several near misses on Lützow with Tallboy bombs in the Kaiserfahrt. She continued in this role until 4 May, by which time she had expended her main battery ammunition. Her crew rigged scuttling charges to destroy the hull but a fire caused the explosives to detonate prematurely. The fate of Lützow was long unclear, as with most of the ships seized by the Soviet Navy. According to the historians Erich Gröner and M. J. Whitley, the Soviet Navy raised the ship in September 1947 and broke her up for scrap in 1948–1949. The historians Hildebrand, Röhr and Steinmetz, in their book Die Deutschen Kriegsschiffe, state that she instead sank off Kolberg, claiming that the Lützow broken up in the late 1940s was instead the Admiral Hipper-class Lützow that had been sold to the Soviet Union in 1940. The historian Hans Georg Prager examined the Soviet archives in the early 2000s and discovered that Lützow had been sunk in weapons tests, in the Baltic Sea off Świnoujście in Poland (under German control and named Swinemünde during the war), on 22 July 1947.

In October 2020 an unexploded Tallboy bomb from the attack on Lützow was found in the Piast Canal (Kaiserfahrt during the war). After evacuating approximately 750 people who lived nearby, an attempt was undertaken to deflagrate it with a remote-controlled device, but it exploded, without casualties.

Footnotes

Notes

Citations

References 
 
 
 
 
 
 
  
 
 
 
 
 
 
 
 
 
 
 

Deutschland-class cruisers
Ships built in Kiel
1931 ships
World War II cruisers of Germany
Maritime incidents in April 1945
Maritime incidents in 1947
World War II shipwrecks in the Baltic Sea
Germany–Soviet Union relations
Shipwrecks in the Baltic Sea
Ships sunk as targets
Military history of Ibiza
Military units and formations of Nazi Germany in the Spanish Civil War